Graciela Fernández may refer to:

 Graciela Fernández Meijide (born 1931), Argentine politician and human rights activist.
 Graciela Fernández-Baca (1933-2020), Peruvian economist and politician.
 Graciela Fernández (philosopher) (born 1946), Argentine writer and philosopher.
 Graciela Fernández Ruiz, teacher and researcher.
 Mirna Graciela Fernandez Alacha (born 1997), Honduran chess player.